"Samson" Chan Kai Yiu (born 5 December 1956) is a Canadian-born Hong Kong racing driver currently competing in the TCR Asia Series. Having previously competed in the Asian Le Mans Series, GT Asia Series and Asian Formula Renault Series amongst others.

Racing career
Chan began his career in 1996 in the BPR Global GT Series. In 2004 he switched to the Asian Formula Renault Series. From 2008-11 he raced in the Porsche Carrera Cup Asia, GT Asia Series and Malaysian Super Series. In 2012 Chan switched to the Asian GT Series, he won the championship that year. In 2014 he raced in the Asian Le Mans Series, finishing the season 3rd in the standings.

In September 2015 it was announced that he would race in the first ever TCR Asia Series round in Sepang, driving a SEAT León Cup Racer for Roadstar Racing.

Racing record

Complete TCR International Series results
(key) (Races in bold indicate pole position) (Races in italics indicate fastest lap)

References

External links
 

1956 births
Living people
Asian Formula Renault Challenge drivers
TCR Asia Series drivers
TCR International Series drivers
Canadian racing drivers
Hong Kong racing drivers
Asian Le Mans Series drivers
FIA GT Championship drivers
DAMS drivers
Craft-Bamboo Racing drivers